Majid Abdollah (also Romanized as Majīd ‘Abdollāh) is a village in Hoseynabad Rural District, in the Central District of Shush County, Khuzestan Province, Iran. At the 2006 census, its population was 206, in 31 families.

References 

Populated places in Shush County